The Ok languages are a family of about a dozen related Trans–New Guinea languages spoken in a contiguous area of eastern Irian Jaya and western Papua New Guinea. The most numerous language is Ngalum, with some 20,000 speakers; the best known is probably Telefol.

The Ok languages have dyadic kinship terms.

History of classification
The Ok languages are clearly related. Alan Healey identified them as a family in 1962. He later noted connections with the Asmat languages and Awyu–Dumut families (Healey 1970).

Voorhoeve developed this into a Central and South New Guinea (CSNG) proposal. As part of CSNG, the Ok languages form part of the original proposal for Trans–New Guinea, a position tentatively maintained by Malcolm Ross, though reduced nearly to Healey's original conception. Ross states that he cannot tell if the similarities in CSNG are shared innovations or retentions from proto-TNG. Voorhoeve argues specifically for an Awyu–Ok relationship, and Foley believes that these two families may be closest to Asmat among the TNG languages.

Loughnane and Fedden (2011) claim to have demonstrated that the erstwhile TNG isolate Oksapmin is related to the Ok family. However, this has not been generally accepted because loans from Mountain Ok have not been accounted for.

Van den Heuvel & Fedden (2014) argue that Greater Awyu and Greater Ok are not genetically related, but that their similarities are due to intensive contact.

Languages
The languages are:

Ok
 West Ok: Kopkaka (incl. Kwer–Burumakok)
 Ngalum
 Central Ok:  Tangko, Nakai–Naki
 Lowland Ok: Iwur–Koma, Muyu–Yonggom, Ninggerum
 Mountain Ok (Min)
Mian (incl. Suganga)
Central Mountain Ok: Tifal, Telefol (incl. Urap)
South Mountain Ok: Bin, Faiwol (incl. Kauwol, Setaman)

Reconstruction

Phonology 
The following are consonants of Proto-Ok:

Vowels may be /*i: *ʉ *u: *e *a *o/, but this reconstruction may be biased toward Telefol.

Pronouns
Healey & Ross reconstruct the pronouns of proto-Ok are as follows:

{| class=wikitable
! !!m.sg!!f.sg!!pl
|-
!1
|colspan=2 align=center|*na-||*nu[b], *ni[b]
|-
!2
|*ka-b-||*ku-b-||*ki[b]
|-
!3
|*ya||*yu||*[y]i
|}

Usher (2020) reconstructs the independent pronouns as,
{| class=wikitable
! !!m.sg!!f.sg!!pl
|-
!1ex
|colspan=2 rowspan=2 align=center|*ne ||*nu
|-
!1in
|*nu-p
|-
!2
|*ke-p||*ku-p ||*ki-p
|-
!3
|*e||*u||*i [3pl.in *i-p]
|}

and the subject suffixes as,
{| class=wikitable
! !!m.sg!!f.sg!!pl
|-
!1
|colspan=2 align=center|*-i ||*-up
|-
!2
|colspan=2 align=center|*-ep ||rowspan=2|*-ip
|-
!3
|*-e/*-o||*-u
|}

Evolution

Proto-Mountain Ok reflexes of proto-Trans-New Guinea (pTNG) etyma, as quoted by Pawley & Hammarström (2018) from Healey (1964):

 *beːn ‘arm’ < *mbena
 *mburuŋ ‘fingernail’ < *mb(i,u)t(i,u)C
 *katuun ‘knee’ < *(ng,k)atVk
 *maŋkat ‘mouth’ < *maŋgat[a]
 *gitak ‘neck’ < *k(a,e)ndak
 *kum ‘side of neck’ < *kuma(n,ŋ)
 *mutuum ‘nose’ < *mundu
 *falaŋ ‘tongue’ < *mbilaŋ
 *kaliim ‘moon’ < *kal(a,i)m

Lexicon

Usher (2020)
Some lexical reconstructions by Usher (2020) are:

{| class="wikitable sortable"
! gloss !! Proto-Ok !! Proto-West Ok !! Ngalum !! Proto-Central Ok !! Proto-Lowland Ok !! Proto-Mountain Ok
|-
! head
| *ambo[t] ||  ||  || *amb[o/u][t] || *ambo || *ŋgambɔːm
|-
! hair/feather
| *kam[y][ː]R || *kamu || kamil || *kep || *kami || ? *karíːm (metathesis)
|-
! ear
| *kindoːŋg || *kireŋg || siroŋ || *kiroŋg || *kende || *kìroːŋ
|-
! eye
| *kiː[n/nd][i] || *k[i]ri || sir || *kit || *kin(-jop) || *kìːn
|-
! nose
| *mitoR || *mete || misol || *m[i]t[o] || *mitu || *mít
|-
! tooth
| *niːŋgiR ||  || niŋil || *niŋgi || *niŋgi || *níːŋg
|-
! tongue
| *poːŋg; *pir[a/o]ŋg || *[p]iraŋg || aploŋ || *poŋg || *poŋg || *póːŋg; *piráŋg
|-
! foot/leg
| *j[aː/oː]n || *jan || jon || *jon || *jon || *jàːn
|-
! blood/red
| *r[aː/eː]m ||  || lam ||  || *jam || *rèːm
|-
! bone
| *kundo[ː]R || *kuro || kulol || *koro || *kondo || *kún
|-
! skin
| *kaːnd || *kat || kal || *kat || *kar || *kàːr
|-
! breast
| *muːk || *muk || muk || *muk || *muk || *múːk
|-
! louse
| *kuwimb || *k[uwi]p || sip || *kuwip || *kuwim || *kìm
|-
! dog
| *ano[ː]n || *anan || anon || *anon || *anon || *majaːn
|-
! pig
| *kowaŋg || *kuwoŋg || kaŋ || *koŋg || *kowaŋg || *k[àː/òː]ŋg
|-
! bird
| *n[a/o][ː]r[t] || *no[r]t || nal || *noe || *on || *awɔːn
|-
! egg
| *windin || *win || wirin || *wirin || *windi || *wín
|-
! tree/fire
| *andz || *a || a || *a || *ar (? *andz) || *às
|-
! man
|  ||  ||  ||  || *ka-tup || 
|-
! woman
| *wVnVŋg ||  || wanaŋ || *kur 'woman/wife' || *w[o]noŋg || *wàn[é/á]ŋg
|-
! sun
| *at[aː/oː]n || *atan || aton || *at[a/o]n || *aton || *átàːn
|-
! moon
| *wakor || *ukot || ukol || *ukoe || *w[o]kor || *wàkár
|-
! water
| *oːk || *ok || ok || *ok || *ok || *òːk
|-
! fire/spark
| *asi[n/ŋg] || *asin || asiŋg || *asi[n/ŋg] || *awop || *weⁱŋg 'fire'
|-
! stone
| *tuːm || *tum || tum || *tum || *tum || *túːm
|-
! path
|  ||  ||  || *[nd/j][y]jip ||  || *ɾeⁱp
|-
! name
| *[a]niŋg[o]R; *wini || *iniŋg || niŋil || *wini || *[a]niŋgo || *wín
|-
! eat
|  ||  ||  || *en- 'eat/drink' || *ane- || *wan 'eat/drink'
|-
! one
|  ||  ||  || *muwim 'one/all' || *mowim || 
|-
! two
|  ||  ||  ||  || *pajop, *[p]aɾop || *asʉ; *aɾe̞ːp
|}

Loughnane and Fedden (2011)
Proto-Ok-Oksapmin reconstructions from Loughnane and Fedden (2011):

{| class="wikitable sortable"
! gloss !! proto-Ok-Oksapmin
|-
| appetizer || *imin
|-
| arrow type || *(w)Vn; *xanaat
|-
| ashes || *kip
|-
| ask || *daxa
|-
| at (place) || *kal
|-
| and, with || *soo
|-
| bandicoot variety || *kajaal
|-
| bat variety || *jVwVm
|-
| be, stay || *p(iː); *(i)n
|-
| bird-of-paradise || *xoloom
|-
| bird variety || *aleem; *ilnem
|-
| blood || *xeim
|-
| blunt (of e.g. knife) || *fiim
|-
| break, dislocate (bone) || *doxo
|-
| burn / light fire || *xVl
|-
| casuarina tree || *dVtVp
|-
| chest (bone) || *tVVb
|-
| cockroach || *tanoom
|-
| cold || *giil
|-
| collar bone || *kʷiŋ
|-
| crumbs || *bVVl
|-
| cucumber || *kimVd
|-
| cut (hair), shave (hair) || *pida-
|-
| dirty (of water) || *miim
|-
| do / make || *xV-
|-
| dog || *mVjaan
|-
| domestic pig || *kVŋ
|-
| down, below || *daak
|-
| dry || *xV(V)x
|-
| eagle, eagle variety || *boxVl
|-
| emphatic pronoun marker || *-xVp
|-
| enemy || *maxaw
|-
| enough || *kii
|-
| excrement || *Vl
|-
| eye || *kiin
|-
| fern || *abal
|-
| fish || *aniiŋ
|-
| frog variety || *siilsiil
|-
| fruit || *dVm
|-
| garden || *(i)laŋ
|-
| greedy, selfish || *ilek
|-
| headman, leader || *kVmoxVm
|-
| heart || *bVpVl
|-
| heavy || *iluum
|-
| hornbill || *xawel
|-
| house post || *(V)bVk
|-
| husk (of nut) || *(w)VVm
|-
| in, hole || *tem
|-
| itchy || *abaalabaal
|-
| kidney || *gV(V)l(V)(p)
|-
| knee || *katVVn
|-
| kookaburra || *k(V)lVx
|-
| light (weight) || *fVVŋ
|-
| little finger || *xatxat
|-
| magic || *kusem
|-
| molar / tooth || *aga(k)
|-
| moon || *kajoop
|-
| mosquito || *gimgim
|-
| name || *win
|-
| nasal mucus || *iin
|-
| neck, throat || *gʷel
|-
| needle || *sVl
|-
| nettle variety || *waan
|-
| nose || *(mu)duum
|-
| no! || *bV(V)s(V)
|-
| old || *pVsel
|-
| pancreas || *kʷVVn
|-
| part of floor || *dixim
|-
| penis || *eit
|-
| point, tip || *puut
|-
| poor || *bVlVp
|-
| possum variety || *sopim
|-
| pregnant || *gVpVn
|-
| pronged bird arrow || *geim
|-
| pus || *isax
|-
| rain shower || *sox
|-
| roundworm || *kasen
|-
| salt (traded from Oksapmin) || *eip
|-
| same as, like || *tap
|-
| seedling / plant / container || *san
|-
| sharp || *atVl
|-
| fed up with || *gaal
|-
| sit with feet and legs together || *goptV(V)
|-
| small mammal || *nVVg
|-
| snake / snake variety || *inap
|-
| sorcery || *kimon
|-
| spark || *tVtup
|-
| squash || *sof(l)it; *sVko
|-
| story || *saŋ
|-
| sugarcane || *kʷeit
|-
| sun || *ataan
|-
| sweet, tasty || *xabaal
|-
| taboo || *awem
|-
| temporary || *(ka)kuun
|-
| thin || *daŋ
|-
| tobacco || *suux
|-
| tongue || *fV(lV)ŋ
|-
| top / bottom of taro || *dVm
|-
| trap || *abil
|-
| self, reflexive || *xol
|-
| urine || *imaan
|-
| vein || *mamel
|-
| vomit || *usaan
|-
| warm || *mVmVn
|-
| wasp || *VVm
|-
| white cockatoo || *nama
|-
| wild pig || *saamVVn
|-
| wind || *inim
|-
| yellow || *xop; *kitax
|-
| child || *mVVn
|-
| father.1POSS1 || *at(umon)
|-
| father.3POSS || *VVlap
|-
| in-law.1POSS || *baad
|-
| man's sister || *bVVp
|-
| uncle.1POSS || *mV(V)m(ein)
|-
| younger brother || *VnVVŋ
|-
| husband and wife || *agam
|-
| mother and children || *Vbdil
|}

Further reading
Proto-Ok-Oksapmin. TransNewGuinea.org. From Loughnane, R. & Fedden, S. 2011. Is Oksapmin Ok?—A Study of the Genetic Relationship between Oksapmin and the Ok Languages. Australian Journal of Linguistics 31:1, 1-42.

References
Citations

Sources

External links 
 Timothy Usher, New Guinea World, Proto–Digul River – Ok
 (ibid.) Proto-Ok (see also reconstructions of individual branches)
Healey, Alan. (1964). The Ok Language Family in New Guinea
Steer, Martin. (2005). Languages of the Upper Sepik and Central New Guinea

 
Languages of Papua New Guinea
Languages of western New Guinea
Awyu–Ok languages